Vietato ai minori (Forbidden to Minors) is a 1992 Italian comedy film directed by Maurizio Ponzi.

Plot 
Officially landed on the Isle of Elba to make a documentary for Rai 1, a crew is actually there to shoot a porn film.
The film has to be starred by the diva Edith Costello and by the young actor Salvatore, who is unaware that he had been hired to shoot hardcore scenes. When Salvatore will discover the truth, problems will begin.

Cast 

 Alessandro Haber as Scalpo
 Mariella Valentini as  Edith Costello
 Massimo Venturiello as  Thomas Parker 
 Sabrina Ferilli as  Barbara 
 Angelo Orlando as  Arnolds  
 Nicola Pistoia as  Juan 
 Paco Reconti as  Salvatore
 Gina Rovere as  Ada
 Lidia Biondi as Talent agent

See also
 List of Italian films of 1992

References

External links

1992 films
Italian comedy films
1992 comedy films
Films directed by Maurizio Ponzi
Films about pornography
1990s Italian-language films
1990s Italian films